Battle of Verona may refer to:
 Battle of Verona (249) where Decius led the Danubian legions to defeat and kill Emperor Philip
 Battle of Verona (312) that pitted Constantine I against one of Maxentius's commanders
 Battle of Verona (402) that pitted Stilicho against Alaric I and his Visigoths
 Battle of Verona (489) between Odovacar and the Ostrogoths led by Theodoric the Great
 Battle of Verona (1799) between the French and Pál Kray's Austrians 
 Battle of Verona (1805) between André Masséna's French and Archduke Charles, Duke of Teschen's Austrians